Undiscovered country may refer to:

Undiscovered Country, the 1979 play by Tom Stoppard
 The Undiscovered Country, the 1998 album (and song) by the Swedish band Destiny
 "The undiscover'd country...", from the "To be, or not to be" soliloquy in Hamlet
 Star Trek VI: The Undiscovered Country, a 1991 film